Sonia Mariana Seraficeanu (born 25 July 1997) is a Romanian handballer who plays as a right wing for Minaur Baia Mare and the Romanian national team.

International honours  
Trofeul Carpaţi:
Second place: 2018

References

External links
Handbalvolei profile 

 

1997 births
Living people
Sportspeople from Hunedoara
Romanian female handball players
CS Minaur Baia Mare (women's handball) players